George Chakiris (born September 16, 1934) is an American actor. He is best known for his appearance in the 1961 film version of West Side Story as Bernardo Nunez, the leader of the Sharks gang, for which he won both the Academy Award for Best Supporting Actor and the Golden Globe Award for Best Supporting Actor – Motion Picture.

Life and career

Early life
Chakiris was born on September 16, 1932 in Norwood, Ohio to Stelianos (Steve) and Zoe (née Anastasiadou) Chakiris, Greek immigrants from Turkey. He is one of eight siblings.

His family moved to Long Beach, California in 1944. He attended Jefferson Junior High school and graduated in 1950 from Woodrow Wilson Classical High School, both in Long Beach.

Chakiris attended one year at Long Beach City College, but wanted to pursue a career in dance, so he dropped out and moved to Hollywood. He worked in the advertising department of May Company California, a department store, and studied dance at night.

Early films
Chakiris made his film debut at age 15 in 1947 in the chorus of Song of Love.

For several years he appeared in small roles, usually as a dancer or a member of the chorus in various musical films, including The Great Caruso (1951), Stars and Stripes Forever (1952), Call Me Madam (1953), Second Chance (1953), and The 5,000 Fingers of Dr. T. (1953).

He was a dancer in Marilyn Monroe's  "Diamonds Are a Girl's Best Friend" number in Gentlemen Prefer Blondes (1953), and he appeared in Give a Girl a Break (1953) and White Christmas (1954).

He can be seen in the wedding dance in the MGM musical film Brigadoon (1954), and appeared in There's No Business Like Show Business (1954).

Paramount
Chakiris appeared as a dancer in White Christmas (1954). A publicity photo of Chakiris with Rosemary Clooney from her scene with "Love, You Didn't Do Right by Me" generated fan mail, and Paramount signed him to a movie contract. "I got lucky with the close-up with Rosemary," said Chakiris.

Chakiris appeared in The Country Girl (1954) and The Girl Rush (1955), dancing with Rosalind Russell in the latter. He received a positive review from Hedda Hopper.

MGM borrowed him for Meet Me in Las Vegas (1956), and he danced in Las Vegas.

Chakiris had a small non-dancing part in Under Fire (1957).

West Side Story
Frustrated with the progress of his career, Chakiris left Hollywood for New York. West Side Story had been running for a year on Broadway, and Chakiris auditioned for Jerome Robbins. He was cast in the London production as Riff, leader of the Jets. The musical launched on the West End in late 1958, and Chakiris received excellent reviews, playing it for almost 22 months.

The Mirisch Brothers bought the film rights to West Side Story and screen-tested Chakiris. They thought his dark complexion made him more suited to the role of Bernardo, leader of the Sharks, and cast Russ Tamblyn as Riff. Filming took seven months.

The film adaptation of West Side Story (1961) was hugely successful, and Chakiris won the Academy Award for Best Supporting Actor for his performance. This led to a long-term contract with the Mirisch Company.

Chakiris played the lead role in Two and Two Make Six (1962), directed by Freddie Francis.

Chakiris starred as a doctor in the film Diamond Head (1963), opposite Charlton Heston and Yvette Mimieux.

In the early 1960s, he embarked on a career as a pop singer, resulting in a couple of minor hits. In 1960, he recorded a single with noted producer Joe Meek.

Three-picture deal with Mirisch Brothers
Chakiris's fee around this time was reported to be $100,000 per movie. His first new film for the Mirisches was Flight from Ashiya (1964), shot in Japan with Yul Brynner and Richard Widmark.

The Mirisches reunited Chakiris with Brynner in Kings of the Sun (1963), an epic about the Mayans, which was a box-office flop. Chakiris went to Italy to make Bebo's Girl (1964) with Claudia Cardinale.

He acted in 633 Squadron (1964), a popular war movie with Cliff Robertson, the last movie he made for the Mirisches. Chakiris later said he made a mistake with his Hollywood films by looking at the "potential" of them instead of the quality of the roles.

Europe
Chakiris played a Greek terrorist in Cyprus in a British film, The High Bright Sun (1965), with Dirk Bogarde. He went to Italy for The Mona Lisa Has Been Stolen  (1965) and France for Is Paris Burning? (1966).

He acted with Catherine Deneuve and Gene Kelly in Jacques Demy's French musical Les Demoiselles de Rochefort (1967). Around this time, his manager cancelled his contract with Capitol Records. However, he enjoyed his time in Europe, saying he had time to "experiment and refine my craft." He also performed a nightclub act at Caesars Palace in Las Vegas, his first stage work since West Side Story. The show was successful and led to Chakiris receiving an offer to appear with Jose Ferrer in a TV production of Kismet (1967). He acted in The Day the Hot Line Got Hot (1968) in France, and The Big Cube (1969) with Lana Turner in America. He made Sharon vestida de rojo (1970) in Spain.

1970s and 1980s
In 1969, Chakiris did a stage production of The Corn Is Green in Chicago with Eileen Herlie. He enjoyed the experience and it revived his confidence as an actor. He said all the films he made after West Side Story had been "a waste of time...it was difficult to take them seriously...It was my fault and no one else's".

Chakiris accepted a dramatic role on Medical Center to change his image.

He starred in the first national tour of the Stephen Sondheim musical Company, touring as Bobby in 1971-1972.

Chakiris worked heavily on TV in the 1970s and 1980s in Britain and the U.S., guest-starring on  Hawaii Five-O, Police Surgeon, Thriller,  Notorious Woman, Wonder Woman, Fantasy Island, CHiPs, Matt Houston, Scarecrow and Mrs. King, Poor Little Rich Girls, Hell Town and Murder, She Wrote.

He appeared in the final episode (March 22, 1974) of The Partridge Family as an old high school boyfriend to Shirley Partridge (Shirley Jones). Their kiss goodbye was the final scene in the program's run. He also starred in the Terry Marcel film Why Not Stay for Breakfast? (1979).

Chakiris appeared in several episodes of Dallas and had a role on Santa Barbara.

Later career

Chakiris had a recurring role on the TV show Superboy as Professor Peterson during the first two seasons from 1988 to 1990.

He was top-billed in the film Pale Blood (1990) and guest-starred on Human Target and The Girls of Lido. He played The King and I on stage in 1995 in Los Angeles.

Chakiris' last role to date was in a 1996 episode of the British sitcom Last of the Summer Wine.

He has given occasional television interviews since then, but is mostly retired. His hobby of making sterling silver jewelry has turned into a new occupation, working as a jewelry designer for his own brand, George Chakiris Collections, consisting of handmade original sterling silver jewelry.

In 2012, he presented a musical about veganism titled Loving the Silent Tears.

In 2021, Chakiris appeared in the film Not to Forget (2021), which aims to raise awareness and funds for the fight against Alzheimer's. The movie, directed by Valerio Zanoli, stars Karen Grassle and five Academy Award winners: George Chakiris, Cloris Leachman, Louis Gossett Jr., Tatum O'Neal, and Olympia Dukakis.

Filmography

Selected television appearances

References

External links

 
 

American male dancers
American male film actors
American male stage actors
Best Supporting Actor Academy Award winners
Best Supporting Actor Golden Globe (film) winners
American people of Greek descent
People from Norwood, Ohio
1932 births
Living people
Male actors from Ohio
American male television actors
20th-century American male actors